ParameciumDB is a database for the genome and biology of the ciliate Paramecium tetraurelia.

See also
 Paramecium

References

External links
 Homepage

Biological databases
Oligohymenophorea